Bradley Ray Collins (born 18 February 1997) is an English professional footballer who plays as a goalkeeper for  club Barnsley.

Career

Chelsea
Born in Southampton, Collins joined Chelsea in 2010 at under-12 level, and signed a scholarship in the summer of 2013. He turned professional in 2014. He was the under-18 first-choice goalkeeper for the 2014–15 season, winning the UEFA Youth League and FA Youth Cup. He was the under-19 and under-21 first-choice for the 2015–16 season. In July 2016 he signed a new contract with the club, until June 2018. In July 2017 he signed a season-long loan deal with League Two club Forest Green Rovers. He made his senior professional debut on 5 August 2017, in a league game against Barnet which ended in a 2–2 draw. On 12 September 2017, Collins was accused of spitting at Sean Raggett in a 1–0 defeat to Lincoln City.

On 31 August 2018, Collins joined League One side Burton Albion on loan until January 2019. In December 2018, after 10 appearances, he stated he wished to extend his stay, and in January 2019 the loan was extended until the end of the season.

Barnsley
On 19 June 2019, Collins joined Championship side Barnsley on a four-year deal with an option for a further year at the end of his deal.

Career statistics

References

1997 births
Living people
Footballers from Southampton
English footballers
Chelsea F.C. players
Forest Green Rovers F.C. players
Burton Albion F.C. players
Barnsley F.C. players
English Football League players
Association football goalkeepers